This is a list of songs about the Cold War.

References

Cold War
Cold War in popular culture
Cold War